The Australian Research Council (ARC) Centre of Excellence in Synthetic Biology (CoESB) is a research centre that combines molecular biology, biotechnology, engineering, philosophy and ethics to design and build microbes that produce valuable products from agricultural and municipal waste. The Centre aims to use these microbes to seed a bio-based circular economy and leverage Australia's strengths in agriculture.

The CoESB was awarded A$35 million in funding by the Australian Research Council, A$1 million from the New South Wales Government and A$13.1 million from partner organisations including Australian and international universities, public and private companies and government departments. As of December 2021 CoESB members have attracted A$23 million in additional funding from competitive grant schemes.

The Centre held a virtual soft launch on 8 December 2020 and is planned to run for seven years (2020-2027).

One start-up company, Samsara, has been spun out the Centre. Samsara is an enviro-tech company using bacterial enzymes to recycle otherwise hard to recycle plastics.

Organisation 
Distinguished Professor Ian Paulsen from Macquarie University is Centre Director and Professor Aleksandra Filipovska from The University of Western Australia is Centre Deputy Director. The CoESB headquarters are located at Macquarie University.

Collaborators and partners of the CoESB are

 The University of Western Australia
 Queensland University of Technology
 The University of Queensland
 University of Newcastle (Australia)|The University of Newcastle
 The Australian National University
 The University of New South Wales
 Curtin University
 Western Sydney University
 The University of Sydney
 The University of Melbourne
 Commonwealth Scientific and Industrial Research Organisation (CSIRO)
 The University of York, UK
 University of Edinburgh, UK
 National University of Singapore
 The University of Manchester, UK
 Imperial College London
 Weizmann Institute of Science
 Chinese Academy of Sciences
 Amyris
 LanzaTech
 Gratuk Technologies
 Microbial Screening Technologies
 Microba
 Spanish National Research Council
 Manildra Group
 Australian Wine Research Institute
 Department of Primary Industries (New South Wales)
 Calysta Energy
 Bioplatforms Australia
 East West Capital
 Neochromosome Inc
 New York University
 Scion New Zealand Crown Research Institute
 Bondi Bio
 Twist Bioscience
 Cemvita Factory
 AllG Foods

The CoESB has engaged a Designer-in-Residence, Dr Jestin George, in 2021-2022 to run workshops for Centre members on the intersection of synthetic biology and design. The Designer-in-Residence in conjunction with a Centre Associate Investigator, Dr Andrew Care, edit an Australian not-for-profit magazine SYNTHESIS.

Research Programs 

The aims and objectives of the CoESB are to "engineer synthetic microbes to create a new environmentally friendly and sustainable advanced biomanufacturing industry" and "build next generation microbial cell factories capable of biochemical transformations that are not possible using natural systems".

The CoESB has three research themes:

 Synthetic Microbial Communities
 Synthetic Organelles
 Neobiochemistry

The Centre also has three research capabilities that underlie and support the research themes to maximise research impact:

 Systems Bioengineering 
 Industrial Translation
 Social Dimensions

Investigators 
As at December 2021, the CoESB has 17 Chief Investigators, 18 Partner Investigators, 22 Associate Investigators, 43 postdoctoral research fellows and 82 higher degree research students conducting research.

References

External links 
 Official website
 Synthetic Biology Australasia (SBA)
 ACOLA report 'Synthetic Biology in Australia: An outlook to 2030'
 Office of the Chief Scientist Australia Occasional Report on Synthetic Biology in Australia

Research institutes in Australia
Biological research institutes in Australia
Molecular biology institutes
Macquarie University